Alfred Azumah Nelson (born 18 August 1992) is a Ghanaian professional footballer who currently plays as a centre-back for Ghana Premier League club Bechem United F.C. and a member of Team Ghana who won the 2013 WAFU Nations Cup.

Club career
Alfred Nelson began his club career with Ghana Premier League club Liberty Professionals prior to joining Stade Nyonnais on 1 February 2012 in the 2011–12 Swiss Challenge League season and Nelson debuted for Stade Nyonnais in the 2011–12 Swiss Challenge League season on 8 March 2012 in a 2–2 draw against SR Delémont at the La Blancherie Stadium and on 30 June 2012 Nelson rejoined Liberty Professionals in the 2012–2013 Ghanaian Premier League and Nelson debuted for Liberty Professionals in the 2012–2013 Ghanaian Premier League season on 24 February 2013 in a 3–3 draw against Asante Kotoko at the Kumasi Sports Stadium.

International career
In November 2013, coach Maxwell Konadu invited Nelson to be included in the Ghana national football team for the 2013 WAFU Nations Cup. Nelson helped the Ghana national football team to a first-place finish after Ghana beat Senegal national football team by three goals to one. Nelson was included in the Ghana national football team that finished runner-up at the 2014 African Nations Championship.

Bechem United
Alfred signed for 2016 Ghana FA Cup winners, Bechem United F.C.in May 2016. He was included in the Bechem United F.C. squad that won the FA Cup at the Cape Coast Stadium in September 2016.

Honours
 Ghanaian FA Cup Winner: 2016

National Team 

 African Nations Championship 2011
 WAFU Nations Cup Winner: 2013
 African Nations Championship Runner-up: 2014

National Team Records

References

1992 births
Living people
Association football fullbacks
Ghanaian footballers
FC Stade Nyonnais players
Swiss Challenge League players
Liberty Professionals F.C. players
Ghana Premier League players
WAFU Nations Cup players
Ghana A' international footballers
2014 African Nations Championship players
Ghana international footballers
Ghanaian expatriate footballers
Ghanaian expatriate sportspeople in Switzerland
Expatriate footballers in Switzerland
2011 African Nations Championship players